Isoptericola chiayiensis is a bacterium from the genus Isoptericola which has been isolated from mangrove soil from Chiayi County, Taiwan.

References

External links
Type strain of Isoptericola chiayiensis at BacDive -  the Bacterial Diversity Metadatabase	

Micrococcales
Bacteria described in 2011